Durham Hosiery Mill is a historic textile mill complex located at Durham, Durham County, North Carolina. It includes seven contributing brick buildings in the complex.  The original Durham Hosiery Mill was built in 1902, and consists of a four-story main building with a six-story Romanesque Revival style tower in front; engine, boiler, and heater houses attached at the rear, and a one-story dye house.  The main building was expanded with a two-story annex in 1904, and a three-story annex in 1906. Other buildings include the triangular Annex No. 1 (1912) and a three-story brick finishing building. By 1910, the Durham Hosiery Mills Corporation was the largest manufacturer of cotton hosiery in the world. The mill was abandoned in 1922.

It was listed on the National Register of Historic Places in 1978.

See also
Durham Hosiery Mills Dye House
Durham Hosiery Mills No. 2-Service Printing Company Building

References

External links

Textile mills in North Carolina
Historic American Buildings Survey in North Carolina
Industrial buildings and structures on the National Register of Historic Places in North Carolina
Romanesque Revival architecture in North Carolina
Industrial buildings completed in 1902
Buildings and structures in Durham, North Carolina
National Register of Historic Places in Durham County, North Carolina